Saint Martin may refer to:

People
 Saint Martin of Tours (c. 316–397), Bishop of Tours, France
 Saint Martin of Braga (c. 520–580), archbishop of Bracara Augusta in Gallaecia (now Braga in Portugal)
 Pope Martin I (598–655)
 Saint Martin of Arades (died 726), canonized monk from Corbie Abbey whose feast day is November 26
 Saint Martin of Soure (died 1146), Portuguese cleric canonized after martyrdom to the Moors of Cordoba
 Saint Martin de Porres (1579–1639), Peruvian lay brother of the Dominican Order
 Saints Martin Tho and Martin Tinh Duc Ta, two Vietnamese Martyrs who died between 1745 and 1862

Places
 Saint Martin (island), an island in the northeast Caribbean, divided between France and the Netherlands
 Collectivity of Saint Martin, French portion of the island
 Sint Maarten, Dutch portion of the island

Angola
 Saint Martin of the Tigers, ghost town in southern Angola

Austria
 Saint Martin, a village in Freudenburg, Magdalensberg, Austria

Bangladesh
 St. Martin's Island, an island in Bangladesh

Canada
 Saint-Martin, Quebec, a parish municipality in the province of Quebec
 Saint-Martin, Laval, Quebec, a residential section of the city of Laval in Quebec

France
 Saint-Martin, Bas-Rhin
 Saint-Martin, Gers
 Saint-Martin, Hautes-Pyrénées
 Saint-Martin, Meurthe-et-Moselle
 Saint-Martin-de-Fenouillet, in the Pyrénées-Orientales 
 Saint-Martin-de-Belleville, in the Savoie 
 Saint-Martin-de-Pallières, in the Var 
 Saint-Martin-de-Ré in the Charente-Maritime 
 Saint-Martin-sur-Oust, in the Morbihan

Switzerland
 Saint-Martin, Fribourg
 St. Martin, Graubünden
 Saint-Martin, Valais

United Kingdom 
St Martin-by-Looe, a civil parish in Cornwall, which doesn't contain St Martin
St Martin-in-Meneage, Cornwall
St Martin, Looe, a hamlet in the parish of Looe, the location of St Martin's Church

Channel Islands 
Saint Martin, Guernsey
Saint Martin, Jersey

United States
 St. Martin Parish, Louisiana
 St. Martin Island, Michigan
 St. Martin, Minnesota
 St. Martin Township, Stearns County, Minnesota
 St. Martin, Mississippi
 St. Martin, Ohio

Schools
 St Martin de Porres, Adelaide, a Catholic school in Adelaide, South Australia
 St. Martin Secondary School, a school in Mississauga, Ontario, Canada
 St. Martin High School, a school located in Ocean Springs, Mississippi

Transit
Saint-Martin station (Laval, Quebec), a former commuter rail station in Canada
Saint-Martin (Paris Métro), a former Paris Métro station
Saint-Martin-d'Étampes (Paris RER), a railroad station in Étampes, Essonne, France
Gare de Caen Saint-Martin, a former railroad station in Caen, France
St. Martins station, a SEPTA Regional Rail station in Philadelphia, Pennsylvania, United States

Other uses
Saint Martin (grape) or Enfariné noir, a French wine grape
San Martin Txiki, a figure in Basque mythology
St. Martin Island Light, a lighthouse in Michigan
Villa Saint-Martin, a centre in Ignatian spirituality in Montreal, Canada

People with the surname
 Alexis St. Martin (1802–1880), Canadian voyageur
 Fernande Saint-Martin (1927–2019), Canadian art critic, museologist, semiologist, visual arts theorist and writer
 Louis Claude de Saint-Martin (1743–1803), French mystic philosopher
 Louis St. Martin (1820–1893), American politician from Louisiana
 Paul Saint-Martin (1901–1940), French politician

See also
 Candes-Saint-Martin, in the Indre-et-Loire , place where Saint Martin of Tours died
 Central Saint Martins, a school in London, UK
 St. Martin de Clare, Nova Scotia
 St Martin-in-the-Fields, an Anglican church in London
 St. Martin's (disambiguation)
 St. Martin's Church (disambiguation)
 St. Martin's Day, a feast on November 11, of St Martin of Tours
 Saint Martin Island (disambiguation)
 Saint-Martin-Vésubie in the Alpes Maritimes 
 San Martín (disambiguation)
 Sankt Martin (disambiguation)
 São Martinho (disambiguation)
 Sint Maarten (disambiguation)